Jeffrey Hassan Newton (born January 4, 1981) is an American former professional basketball player for Ryukyu Golden Kings of the Bj League. He played college basketball for Indiana University.

Career statistics

|-
| align="left"  style="background-color:#afe6ba; border: 1px solid gray" | 2005-06
| align="left" | Osaka
| 38 || 38 || 33.6 || .484 || .216 || .632 || 12.0 || 1.6 || 0.6 ||bgcolor="CFECEC"| 2.7 ||  15.0
|-
| align="left"  style="background-color:#afe6ba; border: 1px solid gray" | 2006-07
| align="left" | Osaka
| 35 || 35 || 36.4 || .512 || .143 || .604 || 13.3 || 2.5 || 1.5 ||bgcolor="CFECEC"| 2.3 || | 15.2
|-
| align="left"  style="background-color:#afe6ba; border: 1px solid gray" | 2007-08
| align="left" | Osaka
| 44 || 44 || 38.4 || .480 || .324 || .688 || 13.3 || 2.8 || 1.6 ||bgcolor="CFECEC"| 3.4 || | 19.0
|-
| align="left" style="background-color:#afe6ba; border: 1px solid gray" |  2008-09
| align="left" | Ryukyu
| 50 || 50 || 36.9 || .477 || .205 || .696 || 13.1 || 2.3 || 0.9 || 1.6 || 17.9
|-
| align="left" | 2009-10
| align="left" | Ryukyu
| 33 || 32 || 33.2 || .455 || .000 || .545 || 11.5 || 1.9 || 0.5 || 1.5 || 14.9
|-
| align="left" | 2010-11
| align="left" | Ryukyu
| 49 || 48 || 31.5 || .502 || .000 || .618 || 10.8 || 2.3 || 0.7 || 1.3 ||  12.4
|-
| align="left" style="background-color:#afe6ba; border: 1px solid gray" |  2011-12
| align="left" | Ryukyu
| 51 || 51 || 31.2 || .484 || .310 || .708 || 9.9 || 2.1 || 0.9 || 0.9 ||  11.3
|-
| align="left" |  2012-13
| align="left" | Ryukyu
| 41 || 36 || 26.4 || .526 || .000 || .618 || 8.8 || 1.4 || 0.9 || 1.2 ||  9.1
|-
| align="left" style="background-color:#afe6ba; border: 1px solid gray" |  2013-14
| align="left" | Ryukyu
| 52 ||  || 22.0 || .406 || .000 || .656 || 6.4 || 0.9 || 0.5 || 0.6 ||  4.2
|-

References

External links 
RealGM profile

1981 births
Living people
American expatriate basketball people in Japan
American expatriate basketball people in Spain
Indiana Hoosiers men's basketball players
Osaka Evessa players
Ryukyu Golden Kings players